Mahabharat is an Indian Hindi-language epic television series based on the ancient Sanskrit epic of the same title. The original airing consisted of a total of 94 episodes and were broadcast from 2 October 1988 to 24 June 1990 on Doordarshan. It was produced by B. R. Chopra and directed by his son, Ravi Chopra. The music was composed by Raj Kamal. The script was written by Pandit Narendra Sharma and the Hindi/Urdu poet Rahi Masoom Raza, based on the epic by Vyasa. Costumes for the series were provided by Maganlal Dresswala. The serial claims to have used the Critical Edition of Bhandarkar Oriental Research Institute as its basic source with Vishnu Sitaram Sukthankar and Shripad Krishna Belwalkar as its primary editor.

Each episode is 40–46 minutes long and begins with a title song that consisted of lyrical content and two verses from the Bhagavad Gita. The title song was sung and the verses rendered by singer Mahendra Kapoor. The title song is followed by a narration by Indian voice-artist Harish Bhimani as a personification of Time, detailing the current circumstances and highlighting the spiritual significance of the content of the episodes 

Mahabharat Katha, another part of the serial was aired on 1997 which covers all the untold stories about Karna's marriage with Padmavati, Arjuna's marriage with Chitrāngadā and Ulupi, and stories about Ghatotkacha, Barbarika, Vrishaketu, Babruvahana, conspiracies of Viprachitti, Ashwamedha Yajna, Dushala's story and aftermath of the Kurukshetra War, which are not covered in the original series.

Premise

The series covers the incidents of epic Mahabharata revolving around Krishna, Pandavas, Kauravas among other characters.

The show begins with Emperor Bharata giving more importance to 'Capacity' than to 'Birth'. He shows the birth of Bhishma and his oath, birth of Pandu, Dhritarashtra and Vidur and birth of Pandavas and Kauravas. The story then focuses on the childhood of Lord Krishna.

Elsewhere, Dronacharya teaches Pandavas and Kauravas and asks to defeat Drupad as Guru Dakshina. Pandavas do so and give half of his kingdom to Drona. For revenge, Drupada obtains Dhrishtadyumna and Draupadi. Dhritarashtra makes Yudhishthir the crown prince of Hastinapur. Shakuni (the maternal uncle of the Kauravas) and Duryodhan hatch a plan to burn Pandavas and Kunti alive, but they survive and go into incognito. Duryodhan is made crown prince of Hastinapur.

Arjuna wins Draupadi in her swayamvara but later shows her marriage with all five Pandavas. Later, Yudhishthir is made the king of Indraprastha and Pandavas conduct Rajsuya Yagna where Draupadi insults Duryodhana. Latter shows Duryodhana's revenge by trying to disrobe her and sending Pandavas along with Draupadi for an exile of 12 years and 1 year of anonymity. Duryodhana argues that the Pandavas violated the condition of anonymity in their last year of exile, therefore they must spend another 12 years in exile followed by another year of exile in anonymity. This conflict begins to sows the seed for the Mahabharata War.

Arjun and Subhadra's son Abhimanyu marries Uttara. Krishna tries to make peace between both parties. Indra in the disguise of a Brahmin took Karna's armor and earrings. Kunti's sorrow on the corpse of Karna reveals Karna's true identity of being the eldest Pandava.

Before Mahabharata War, Shri Krishna enlightens Arjuna about the "Bhagavad Gita" and showed his Virata Swaroopa to Arjuna.  The latter shows the deaths of Bheeshma, Drona, Karna, Abhimanyu, Shalya, Shakuni, Jayadrata, Ghatotkacha, 100 Kauravas, 5 sons of Draupadi and many other warriors in the war leading to the victory of Pandavas over Kauravas. Gandhari holds Krishna responsible for her son's death and curses that his family will also get destroyed. The show ends with Yudhishthir's Rajyabhishek and Bhishma's death.

Cast

Main

 Nitish Bharadwaj as Krishna, eighth avatar of Vishnu, Devaki-Vasudev's eighth son, foster son of Nand and Yashoda, Balaram and Subhadra's brother, Pandavas' cousin, Radha's consort, husband of Rukmini, Satyabhama and other 6 rani, Rama in the song sabso Uchi prem sagaai
 Kewal Shah as adolescent Krishna
 Mukesh Khanna as Bhishma, Shantanu-Ganga's eighth son, eighth Vasu, Satyavati's step-son, elder half-brother of Chitrangada and Vichitravirya, paternal uncle of Dhritrashtra, Pandu, and Vidur, paternal grand-uncle of the Kauravas and the Pandavas
 Krish Malik as adolescent Bhishma
 Gajendra Chauhan as Yudhishthir, first Pandava, son of Kunti and Yama, eldest son of Kuru Clan, King of Indraprastha and later Hastinapura, husband of Draupadi, father of Prativindhya, Kaurava's Elder Cousin
 Sonu as young Yudhishthir
 Praveen Kumar as Bhim, second Pandava, son of Kunti and Vayu, Yuvraaj (crown prince) of Indraprastha, husband of Draupadi and Hidimba, father of Ghatotkacha, Sutasoma, Duryodhan's Younger Cousin
 Mallik as young Bhim
 Arjun aka Firoz Khan as Arjuna, third Pandava, son of Kunti and Indra, husband of Draupadi, Uloopi, Chitrangada and Subhadra, brother-in-law of Balaram and Krishna, father of Abhimanyu, Babruvahana, Iravan and Shrutakarma , Duryodhan's Younger cousin
 Ankur Javeri as young Arjuna
 Roopa Ganguly as Draupadi, wife of Pandavas, also called as Panchali and Yagyaseni, younger daughter of Drupad, Princess of Panchala, sister of Dhrishtadhyumna and Shikhandi, mother of Upapandavas
 Puneet Issar as Duryodhan, eldest son of Gandhari and Dhritarashtra, elder brother of 99 Kauravas, husband of Bhanumati, Yudhishthir's younger cousin, Elder Cousin of other 4 Pandavas, Lakshmanaa's Father, Crown prince of Hastinapur, Karna's best friend
Amit Shukla as young Duryodhan
 Pankaj Dheer as Karna, son of Kunti and Surya, Adhiratha-Radha's foster son, King of Anga, Pandava's Eldest Brother, Padmaavati's Husband, Duryodhan's best friend
 Harendra Paintal as young Karna
 Sameer Chitre as Nakul, fourth Pandava, son of Madri and Ashwini Kumara, husband of Draupadi, father of Shatanika
 Sanjeev Chitre as Sahadeva, fifth Pandav, son of Madri and Ashwini Kumara, husband of Draupadi and father of Shrutasena
 Vinod Kapoor as Dushasan, second son of Gandhari and Dhritarashtra, Duryodhan's younger brother
 Kaushal Shah as young Dushasan
 Gufi Paintal as Shakuni, Gandhari's brother, later King of Gandhara, maternal uncle of Duryodhan and his 99 brothers
 Girija Shankar as Dhritrashtra, Vichitravirya's son from Ambika (eldest), later king of Hastinapur, father of Kauravas
 Renuka Israni as Gandhari, wife of Dhritrashtra, Queen of Hastinapur, mother of Kauravas, princess of Gandhara, sister of Shakuni
 Nazneen as Kunti, Pandu's first wife, mother of Karna, Yudhisthira, Bhim and Arjuna, daughter of Shoorsen, Vasudev's sister, Yadava princess, foster daughter of Kuntibhoj
 Virendra Razdan as Vidur, the Mahaa Mantri of Hastinapur, son of Ambika's head maid Parishrami, fathered by Vyasa, half-brother to the kings Dhritarashtra and Pandu of Hastinapura, uncle of Pandavas and Kauravas
 Surendra Pal as Dronacharya, Kauravas and Pandavas' guru, Ashwatthama's father
 Dharmesh Tiwari as Kripacharya, family teacher, brother of Kripi, Ashwatthama's maternal uncle
 Pradeep Rawat as Ashwatthama, son of Dronacharya
Ayush Shah as young Ashwatthama

Recurring
 Harish Bhimani as Samay / narrator
 Sagar Salunke as Balarama, Krishna's elder half brother
 Aloka Mukherjee as Subhadra, Arjuna's fourth wife, Abhimanyu's mother, Vasudev's and Rohini's daughter, Krishna-Balaram's younger sister, Yadava princess
 Raj Babbar as Bharata, paternal ancestor of the Kauravas and Pandavas, son of King Dushyanta and Shakuntala
 Ashalata Wabgaonkar as Shakuntala, Bharata's mother, King Dushyanta's wife
 Rishabh Shukla as Shantanu, descendant of King Bharata, husband of Ganga and Satyavati, father of Bhishma, Chitrangada and Vichitravirya, paternal grandfather of Dhritarashtra and Pandu, paternal great-grandfather of the Kauravas and the Pandavas
 Kiran Juneja as Ganga, Shantanu's first wife, Bhishma's mother, the holy river of Hindus
 Debashree Roy as Satyavati, King Shantanu's second wife; Vyasa, Chitrangada, and Vichitravirya's mother, Bhishma's step-mother, paternal grandmother of Dhritarashtra, Pandu, and Vidur, paternal great-grandmother of the Kauravas and the Pandavas
 Rajesh Vivek as Maharishi Ved Vyas, son of sage Parashara and Satyavati, father of Dhritarashtra, Pandu and Vidura, partial incarnation of Vishnu, author of Mahabharata
 Sudesh Berry as Vichitravirya, Shantanu-Satyavati's second son after Chitrangada, Bhisma's step brother, husband of Ambika and Ambalika, father of Dhritarashtra and Pandu, paternal grandfather of the Kauravas and the Pandavas
 Jahnavi as Amba, the first princess of Kashi, Shikhandi in the next life
 Meena Chakrabarty as Ambika, second princess of Kashi, Vichitravirya's first queen, mother of Dhritarashtra, paternal grandmother of the Kauravas
 Menaka Babbar as Ambalika, third princess of Kashi, Vichitravirya's second queen, mother of Pandu, paternal grandmother of the Pandavas
 Tarakesh Chauhan as Pandu, Vichitravirya's son from Ambalika (the youngest wife), King of Hastinapur, husband of Kunti and Madri, father of Pandavas
 Roma Manek as Madri, Pandu's second wife, Madra princess, mother of Nakul and Sahadev
 Asha Singh as Kripi, sister of Kripacharya, wife of Dronacharya and mother of Ashwathama
 Kamlesh Maan as Devi Sulabha, Vidur's wife
 Lalit Mohan Tiwari as Sanjaya, Dhritarashtra's advisor and also his charioteer
 Kapil Kumar as Shalya, Madri's elder brother, King of Madra
 Shahla Khan as Hidimbā, Hidimb's sister, Bheem's wife, Kunti's daughter-in-law and Ghatotkacha's mother
 Razak Khan as Ghatotkacha, son of Bhima and Hidimbi
 Mayur Verma (Master Mayur) as Abhimanyu, son of Arjun and Subhadra, husband of Uttara, father of Parikshit
 Varsha Usgaonkar as Uttara, Abhimanyu's wife, Matsya princess, mother of Parikshit
 Dinesh Anand as Vikarna, son of Gandhari and Dhritarashtra, Duyodhan's younger brother
 Paramjeet Chima as Dashraj, Satyavati's father
 Om Katare as Adhiratha, charioteer, Karna's foster father
 Saroj Sharma as Radha, Adhiratha's wife, Karna's foster mother
 Ramlal Gupta as Ugrasena, King of Mathura, Surasena, father of Kansa and Devaki
 Goga Kapoor as Kansa, son of Ugrasena, elder brother of Devaki, maternal uncle of Krishna and Balarama
 Vishnu Sharma as Vasudev, son of Shurasena, brother of Kunti, prince of Vrishni tribe, father of Balarama, Krishna, and Subhadra, maternal uncle of the Pandavas
 Kshama Raj as Rohini, Vasudeva's elder wife, mother of Balarama
 Sheela Sharma as Devaki, Vasudev's younger wife, younger sister of Kansa, daughter of Ugrasena, mother of Krishna and Subhadra
 Rasik Dave as Nanda, chief of Gokul, foster father of Krishna
 Manju Vyas as Yashoda, Nand's wife, foster mother of Krishna
 Channa Ruparel as Maharani Rukmini, Krishna's chief wife 
 Parijat as Devi Radha, Krishna's consort
Sumeet Raghavan as adolescent Sudama
 Ajay Sinha as Akroor, Vrishni chief
 Bashir Khan as Satyaki, General
 Ashok Banthia as Senapati Kritavarma
 Pradeep Sharma as Panchalaraj Drupada, Draupadi's father, King of Panchala
 Arun Bakshi as Yuvraaj Dhrishtadyumna, Draupadi's elder brother, Prince of Panchala
 Paintal as Shikhandi, Drupad's elder son, adult Sudama
 Ashok Sharma as Virata, King of Matsya
 Chandni Sharma as Sudeshna, Queen of Matsya 
 Sameer Rajda as Uttar, crown prince of Matsya
 Sharat Saxena as Kichaka, Army General of Matsya
 Deep Dhillon as Jayadratha, Duhsala's husband, Kauravas' brother-in-law, King of Sindhu
 Vikrant Mathur as Subala, Shakuni's and Gandhari's father, King of Gandhara
 Shivendra Mahal as Parashurama and Shiva 
 Satish Kaul as Devraj Indra
 Gopi Krishna as Chitrasena
 Rakesh Bidua as Kashya, King of Kashi
 Rana Jung Bahadur as Jarasandha, King of Magadha, father-in-law of Kamsa
 Karunakar Pathak as Shishupala, King of Chedi, a maternal cousin of Krishna and Balarama
 Pawan Shukla as Shalva Kumar, Prince of Salwa, Princess Amba's lover 
 Prem Sagar as Rishi Kanva
 Pankaj Berry as Rishi Kindama, a sage who cursed Pandu
 Mini Singh as Rishi Kindama's wife

Episodic appearance
 Vikas Prasad as Ekalavya 
 Randhir Singh as Hidimb and Putana
 Sabrina as Putana (cameo)
 Dara Singh as Hanuman (cameo)
 Raj Kishore as Rajpurohit of Panchal Kingdom (cameo)
 Dinesh Kaushik as Rukmi
 Bashir Khan as Rishi Parashar, father of Vyasa, Senapati of Hastinapura

Episodes

Episode 1 – Introduction of Kuru Family, Raja Bharat and Raja Shantanu

Episode 2 – Ganga Kills Her Sons

Episode 3 – Bhishma is Grown-up

Episode 4 – Bhishma Pratigya & Iccha Mrityu Vardaan

Episode 5 – Amba, Ambika and Ambalika's Introduction

Episode 6 – Birth of Pandu, Dhritarashtra and Vidur

Episode 7 – Karna's Birth-story

Episode 8 – Story of Adhiratha and Radha, Pandu is cursed

Episode 9 – Dhritarashtra is king, Pandu's sanyas and Pandavas are born.

Episode 10 – Kansa is king at Mathura and Akashwani about Krishna

Episode 11 – Birth of Balarama and Krishna

Episode 12 – Krishna Janma (birth of Krishna) celebrations and Pootna's Death

Episode 13 – Krishna Brahmand Darshan and Krishna gets caught while stealing Makhan

Episode 14 – Maiya Mori Mai nahi makhan khayo and Kaliya Nag Tandav

Episode 15 – Radha and Gopikas, protest against Mathura, Devakasur and Trulambasur Vadh

Episode 16 – Kansa invites Krishna to Mathura

Episode 17 – Kansa Vadh; Krishna meets his parents and grandfather

Episode 18 – Karna’s adoption, Pandu and Madri's Death

Episode 19 – Satyavati, Ambika and Ambalika take sanyas with Rishi Vyas

Episode 20 – Karna grows up; Duryodhan Poisons Bhim and Bhim gets strength of 1000 Elephants

Episode 21 – Sudama's chivda story and Drona arrives at Hastinapur

Episode 22 – Shastra Pooja, Drona rejects Karna, Arjuna's test

Episode 23 – Karna's education under Parshurama,Story of Eklavya

Episode 24 – Karna enters the Rangbhoomi

Episode 25 – Karna is crowned as king of Anga, Drona's guru Dakshina to capture Dhrupad

Episode 26 – Krishna gets Sudarshana chakra from Parshuram, defeats Jarasandh and orders building Dwaraka

Episode 27 – Yudhishthira is crowned as Prince. Rukmini of Vidarbha is Being Forced to Marry Shishupal

Episode 28 – Krishna Rescues Rukmini and marry her

Episode 29 – Lakshagraha is built-in Varnavata by Purochana

Episode 30 – Tunneling in Varnavat Begins

Episode 31 – Escape from Lakshagraha

Episode 32 – Hidimb Vadh and Bhima's marriage with demoness Hidimba

Episode 33 – Bheema kills Bakasura

Episode 34 – Drishtadhyumna & Draupadi Birth and Draupadi Swayamvar

Episode 35 – Arjuna wins Draupadi and later she became the wife of the 5 Pandavas

Episode 36 – Pandavas Leave from Panchal Kingdom to Hastinapur

Episode 37 – Pandavas arrive at Hastinapur and Partition of kingdom

Episode 38 – Pandav Get Khandavprastha

Episode 39 – Coronation of Yudhirsthir, Khandavprastha Becomes Indraprastha

Episode 40 – Balraam talks about Subhadra’s marriage, Arjun elopes with Subhadra

Episode 41 – Arjuna weds Subhadra. Arjun gets Devdatta Conch and Gandiva and Bhima gets his Gada

Episode 42 – Jarasandha Vadh, Rajsuya Yagnya begins, Shishupala's story

Episode 43 – Rajsuya Yagya, Shishupala Vadh

Episode 44 – Vyas predicts war, Draupadi laughs at Duryodhana

Episode 45 – Pandavas go to Hastinapur to gamble

Episode 46 – Yudhishthir loses Everything in the gamble

Episode 47 – Vastraharan of Draupadi

Episode 48 – Pandavas bet back everything

Episode 49 – Re-match of Dyut

Episode 50 – Vanvas Begins

Episode 51 – Gandharvas catch Duryodhan

Episode 52 – Arjuna gets Pashupatastra, Karna conquers the world

Episode 53 – Krishna's story of one grain of rice, Bheema meets Ghatotkacha and Hanuman, Arjun learns dance from Chitrasena

Episode 54 – Arjuna gets curse of impotency from Urvashi, Abhimanyu as a kid, Jayadrath's head is shaved

Episode 55 – Story of Poisoned Water and Yaksha's Questions to Yudhishthira, Abhimanyu is Grown-up

Episode 56 – Agyatvas in Matsya Desh

Episode 57 – Parshuram's curse to Karna

Episode 58 – Keechaka Vadh by Bheema

Episode 59 – Kaurav Attack Matsya Desh

Episode 60 – Viraat war and clothes for Uttaraa's dolls

Episode 61 – Abhimanyu and Uttaraa's marriage and Pandavs decide to send a Doot to Hastinapur

Episode 62 – Dhritarashtra does not agree and sends Sanjay

Episode 63 – Duryodhana gets Narayani Sena from Krishna, Krishna agrees to become charioteer of Arjuna

Episode 64 – Krishna Goes to Hastinapur as Shanti Doot

Episode 65 – krishna's Viraat avatar, Karna gives away his kawacha and kundala to Indra

Episode 66 – Karna's identity is disclosed

Episode 67 – Kunti meets Karna

Episode 68 – Sanjay gets Divya Drishti from Vyasa

Episode 69 – Duryodhan Tricks Shalya to join Kauravas

Episode 70 – Shikhandi's Story of rebirth

Episode 71 – Rules of war are laid

Episode 72 – Kurukshetra War begins and Arjun Drops His weapons, Geeta Saar begins

Episode 73 – Geeta Saar continues

Episode 74 – Geeta Saar continues and Krishna shows his Maha-avatar

Episode 75 – Yudhishthira gets blessings, Yuyutsu changes side and war begins, Abhimanyu faces Bhishma

Episode 76 – Uttar dies, Arjuna faces Bhishma and day 2 begins

Episode 77 – 3rd day is over, 4th day begins, Bhima is surrounded, 10 Kauravas are killed, Krishna takes out his Sudarshan

Episode 78 – 9th Day is over and 16 Kauravs are dead, Bhishma tells how to take him out of the war

Episode 79 – Arjuna shoots arrows at Bhishma

Episode 80 – Karna enters the field, Drona tries to capture Yudhishthir but is unsuccessful, Shantanu comes to Bhishma

Episode 81 – Chakra Vyuh Planned, Duryodhan Promises Susharma

Episode 82 – Abhimanyu Vadh; Uttaraa is pregnant

Episode 83 – Arjuna Vows to Kill Jayadrath and Story About Jayadratha's Curse

Episode 84 – Arjuna Breaks Kamal Vyuh to Get to Jayadratha

Episode 85 – Shri Krishna covers the Sun with his Sudarshana Chakra, Jayadratha Vadh

Episode 86 – Ghatotkacha enters battle; Karna kills Ghatotkacha by Shakti Astra

Episode 87 – Virat and Drupad are killed, Drona Dies

Episode 88 – Bheema kills Dushashana, Karna spares Arjun’s life again

Episode 89 – Karna killed by Arjun.

Episode 90 – Shakuni and Shalya die, Duryodhana and Pandavas learn about Karna's truth, Yudhishthir curses all womankind, Gandhari curses Krishna & Yaduvansh, Duryodhan becomes iron bodied

Episode 91 – Balaram arrives, Bhim-Duryodhan Gada Yudh, Duryodhan fatally wounded, Balaram decides to kill Bhim

Episode 92 – Duryodhan Dies, Ashwatthama, Kripa and Kritvarma remain, Ashwathama kill the sons of Pandavas (Uppandavas) and Drishtadyumna, Ashwathama tries to kill Uttara's unborn son, Krishna curses Ashwatthama, Parikshit is Born

Episode 93 – Dhritarashtra-Vidur discussion about Dharma, Pandavas arrive at Hastinapur, Dhritarashtra Tries to kill Bhim

Episode 94 – Dhritarashtra and Gandhari ready for Vanaprasthan. Yudhisthir Becomes King of Hastinapur, Bhishma leaves his body.

Production

Development
According to Director Ravichopra each episode was made up of ₹6.5 lakh to ₹7 lakh. Casting for the series began in 1986 and shooting started off in mid-1988. Show was shot mostly at Mumbai's Film City, and the grand battle of Kurukshetra was shot in Rajasthan, with thousands of extras to fill the screen.

The series was initially submitted to the channel for 104 episodes which was later shortened to 94 episodes.

Casting
15,000 people applied to play different roles in the Mahabharat TV series. The casting team led by Gufi Paintal shortlisted them and called around 1,500 for video screen tests Almost all actors in the series were newcomers, barring Raj Babbar who played King Bharat, Debashree Roy who played Satyavati. Nitish Bharadwaj was chosen by B.R. Chopra, Ravi Chopra, Pandit Narendra Sharma and Rahi Masoom Raza, to play the central role of Krishna, at the age of 23. Initially, he was chosen for playing Vidur. But Virendra Razdan was cast for it as B.R.Chopra considered Bharadwaj young to play the role. Then Bharadwaj was offered to play Nakul and Sahadev, but he rejected and wanted to play Abhimanyu. Days later, he was called and finalized to play Krishna. Firoz Khan was chosen to portray the character of Arjuna (which he later adopted as his screen name, to not become confused with a more popular actor of the same name) despite being rejected in auditions. Asian games gold medalist Praveen Kumar was selected to portray Bhima after Chopra was looking for someone "who could look the robust historical character". Around six actresses were shortlisted for the role of Draupadi, including Juhi Chawla, who opted out of the show as she had bagged a film. Ramya Krishnan and Roopa Ganguly were the final names, and at last Roopa Ganguly was chosen, as her Hindi was good. Govinda and Chunky Pandey were signed for the role of Abhimanyu, but they opted out when they bagged films. Later, Master Mayur played the role. Mukesh Khanna who wished to play role of Arjun was initially offered the role of Duryodhan. But later he was signed for Dhronacharya. When Vijayendra Ghadge dropped his role of Bhisma, Khanna got the role of Bhishma. Puneet Issar was offered to play the role of Bheem but was cast as Duryodhan on his wish. The casting director of the show, GufiPaintal had offered role of Shakuni by the maker's of Mahabharat.

Music 
Mahabharat's music was composed by Raj Kamal and lyrics were penned by Pandit Narendra Sharma. Some songs were taken from works of devotional writers like Surdas, Raskhan etc. Apart from main songs there are also several short verses decoding summary of each episode. All those verse were sung by Mahendra Kapoor.

Broadcast
In India the series was originally broadcast on DD National. It was shown in the United Kingdom by the BBC, where it achieved audience figures of 5 million. It was also the first programme broadcast on BBC2 after its 1991 revamp, but it had also been shown late at night on BBC1 the previous year.

The show was again telecast on DD Bharati from 28 March 2020, on DD Retro from 13 April 2020, on Colors TV from 4 May 2020 as well as Star Bharat during the lockdown due to coronavirus.

Reception
Ganguly was applauded for her performance in the sequence. Ravi Chopra later disclosed that she was originally weeping while enacting in the Vastraharan sequence and the crew members had to console her later to make her stop.|The sequence is often claimed to be the most climactic one of the series. For the sequence Chopra recreated the visual effect of the Vastraharan sequence of Babubhai Mistry's Mahabharat (1965) starring Padmini as Draupadi. His visual effects won more favour than that of the 1965 film and has still been considered by a part of critics to be the most brilliant in line. of the most successful television series in Indian television history. In common with the "Ramayana" serial, the broadcasting of a Mahabharat episode was associated with the simultaneous emptying of streets in the cities and people leaving work early to watch it. Along with general audience many big names from Hindi film industry like Rajesh Khanna, Amitabh Bachchan, Jeetendra, Hema Malini and Dharmendra also praised the show.

During its rerun in COVID-19 lockdown in India, it became the second most watched Indian TV show after Ramayan (1987). In week 13, it garnered 145.8 million impressions with both morning and evening slots combined on DD Bharati. After Ramayan ended, Mahabharat became the most watched TV show until its end. The series ended with 22.9 million viewership.

Home media
The series was uploaded onto the website "Rajshri.com" along with its dubbed Tamil version. Home video of the Bengali-dubbed version of this series has been released by Heart Video. In 2019, Pen India Ltd bought the rights of the show and uploaded all the episodes on its devotional YouTube channel Pen Bhakti including its spin-off series Mahabharat Katha.

Legacy
Mahabharat along with Ramayan (1987), became one of the most successful television series based on an epic in Indian television history.

It was massively entered into the GuinnessWorldrecord of record of maximum viewership in television with 97% viewership 

Many actors became popular through their appearances in this series.

 Nitish Bharadwaj became famous as Lord Krishna and later he also played lead role in Chopra's another mythological show Vishnu Puran.
 Roopa Ganguly, who played Draupadi, went on to become a successful actress in Bengali cinema.
 Pankaj Dheer received immense popularity after playing Karna. His pictures are used in textbooks as reference to Karna and the actor also revealed that his statues are worshipped in temples in Karnal and Bastar.
 Firoz Khan changed his name to "Arjun" professionally after finding success with the role of Arjun.
 Mukesh Khanna, who was a not so famous actor until then, shot to fame as Bhishma and named his production company after his character.

References

External links
 

Television series based on Mahabharata
DD National original programming
1988 Indian television series debuts
1990 Indian television series endings
1980s Indian television series
Television shows based on poems